Kas Kalyal is a village in the Mirpur Tehsil of Mirpur District of Azad Kashmir, Pakistan.

Demography 

According to the 1998 census of Pakistan, its population was 1,614.

History 

Like in many villages in the Mirpur region, many villagers have emigrated to the United Kingdom. The village gets its name from the Kalyals tribe of Jats, who form the bulk of the population.

References 

Populated places in Mirpur District